Whitting as a surname may refer to:

Caroline Whitting (c.1834–?), New Zealand murderer
Edward Whitting (1872–1938), English cricketer
Ian Whitting (born 1953), British diplomat
Todd Whitting (born 1972), American college baseball coach and former player

See also
Whiting (surname)